Bötticher, sometimes spelled Boetticher, is a surname of Germanic origin. Notable people with the surname include:

Persons with the surname Bötticher
List may include persons with the surname von Bötticher.
 Adolf Bötticher (1842–1901), German art historian and conservator
 Hans Bötticher (1883–1934), German author and painter best known by the pseudonym Joachim Ringelnatz
 Johann Friedrich Bötticher, an historic misspelling of Johann Friedrich Böttger (1682–1719), German alchemist credited with the industrial manufacturing process of Meissen porcelain.
 Karl Bötticher (1806–1889), German architect and instructor to Martin Gropius
 Paul Bötticher aka Paul de Lagarde (1827–1891), German scholar noted for his writings on oriental languages, the Bible, and his own antisemitic views

Persons with the surname Boetticher
List may include persons with the surname von Boetticher.
 Budd Boetticher (1916–2001), American film director most famous for 1950s Hollywood Westerns
 Friedrich Heinrich von Boetticher, German art historian
 Gale Boetticher, fictional American chemist from the AMC television series Breaking Bad
 Hans von Boetticher (1886–1958), German zoologist who worked on ornithology and entomology
 Karl Heinrich von Boetticher (1833–1907), German Secretary of the Interior (1880–1897) and Vice Chancellor of Germany (1881–1897).
 Walter von Boetticher (1853–1945), German historian, genealogist and physician.

Things
 Sociedad Recreativa Villaverde Boetticher Club de Fútbol, soccer club in Madrid, Spain

See also
 Böttger

German-language surnames